Assassination in Rome is a 1965 Italian thriller film of the giallo genre directed by Silvio Amadio.

Cast
Hugh O'Brian ...  Dick Sherman
Cyd Charisse ...  Shelley North
Eleonora Rossi Drago ...  Erika Tiller
Alberto Closas ...  Inspector Baudi
Memmo Carotenuto
Alberto Dalbés
Juliette Mayniel ...  Lorena Borelli
Franco Giacobini
Manuel Alexandre
Antonio Casas
Carlos Casaravilla
Gina Rovere
Philippe Lemaire
Mario Feliciani
José María Seoane

Production
The film was meant to star John Gavin but he pulled out at the last minute and was replaced by Hugh O'Brian.

References

External links 
 

1965 films
1960s Italian-language films
English-language Italian films
1960s English-language films
1960s thriller films
Films directed by Silvio Amadio
Films scored by Armando Trovajoli
1960s multilingual films
Italian multilingual films
1960s Italian films